Antônio Ivaldo Rodrigues, better known as Ivaldo Rodrigues (born February 6, 1974) is a Brazilian politician. He is the municipal president of PDT (2012–present). Rodrigues was the alderman of São Luís (2009–2017). Rodrigues is a Municipal Secretary of Agriculture, Fisheries and Supply (2017–present).

Political career 
In 2004, Ivaldo Rodrigues ran for alderman of São Luís, without success.

In 2006, Ivaldo Rodrigues endorsed Jackson Lago and Lula.

In 2008, Ivaldo Rodrigues ran for alderman of São Luís, being elected. Endorsed João Castelo.

In 2010, Ivaldo Rodrigues endorsed Jackson Lago and Dilma Rousseff.

In 2012, Ivaldo Rodrigues was reelected alderman of São Luís. Endorsed Edivaldo Holanda Júnior.

In 2014, Ivaldo Rodrigues endorsed Flávio Dino and Dilma Rousseff.

In 2016, Ivaldo Rodrigues was reelected alderman of São Luís. Endorsed Edivaldo Holanda Júnior.

References 

1974 births
Living people
Democratic Labour Party (Brazil) politicians
Workers' Party (Brazil) politicians